Phlegmacium subfoetidum is a species of mushroom producing fungus in the family Cortinariaceae. It was previously known as Cortinarius subfoetidus.

Taxonomy 
It was described as new to science in 1944 by American mycologist Alexander H. Smith who classified it as Cortinarius subfoetidus. It was placed in Cortinarius (subgenus Phlegmacium).

In 1999 Meinhard Michael Moser and Joe Ammirati published the variety Cortinarius subfoetidus var. bubalinovelatus.

In 2022 the species was transferred from Cortinarius and reclassified as Phlegmacium subfoetidum based on genomic data.

Description
The mushroom cap is 3–10 cm wide, convex to flat (sometime umbonate), lavender to pinkish, bluish in age, slimy, smooth, with a fruity odor. The gills are adnate to notched, lilac then brown as the spores mature. The stalk is 5–10 cm tall and 1–2 cm wide, equal or clavate.

Its edibility is unknown, but it is not recommended due to its similarity to deadly poisonous species.

Similar species include Cortinarius griseoviolaceus and C. traganus.

Habitat and distribution 
Found in the Pacific Northwest region of the United States and Canada.

See also

List of Cortinarius species

References

External links

subfoetidus
Fungi described in 1944
Fungi of Canada
Fungi of the United States
Fungi without expected TNC conservation status